Gospa is a 1995 religious drama starring Martin Sheen and Morgan Fairchild about pilgrimages to a small village in Herzegovina where six school children say the Virgin Mary ("Our Lady") appeared in 1981 (see Our Lady of Međugorje).

The movie highlights alleged persecutions of Catholic Croats, particularly of the clergy, by the communist authorities of the Socialist Federal Republic of Yugoslavia. Martin Sheen plays Franciscan priest Jozo Zovko, who was tried for sedition by the Yugoslav government.

Cast 
Martin Sheen as Father Jozo Zovko 
Michael York as Milan Vuković 
Morgan Fairchild as Sister Fabijana Zovko 
Paul Guilfoyle  as Miodrag Dobrović   
Ray Girardin as father Zrinko Čuvalo 
Frank Finlay as Monsignor 
Tony Zazula as prosecutor Govanović 
William Hootkins as judge Marulić 
Angelo Santiago as Vlado Palić  
Mustafa Nadarević as major Stović
Slavko Brankov as 2nd Jail Guard 
Daniela Čolić-Prizmić as French Journalist (as Nela Čolić-Prizmić)
Anica Tomić as Mirjana Dragičević

Reception
The film won the Golden Gate of Pula (audience award for best film as voted by festival audiences) at the 42nd Pula Film Festival, and Vjesnik award Jelen.

Roger Ebert gave Gospa two stars out of four. He noted the enthusiastic responses by the film's audiences in the United States, but felt that its "impact is religious and political, not cinematic", and that "it really isn't a very good film". In 2014, Croatian TV critic Zrinka Pavlić described it as a "bad film, with bad acting and an almost cartoon-like depiction of the situation it deals with".

Film critic and Catholic priest Peter Malone writes that the film's "strong pro-Croatian perspective seems more propaganda-like than informative" and most of the dialogue is "stilted writing".

References

External links

'Gospa' Sneaks Into Town on Wing, Prayer

1995 films
Films about Catholicism
American films based on actual events
Croatian drama films
English-language Croatian films
Films directed by Jakov Sedlar
Marian apparitions in film
1990s English-language films
American drama films
1990s American films